Neal Mandy (born 5 November 1962) is a South African cricketer. He played in ten first-class matches for Eastern Province between 1980/81 and 1983/84.

See also
 List of Eastern Province representative cricketers

References

External links
 

1962 births
Living people
South African cricketers
Eastern Province cricketers
Cricketers from Port Elizabeth